These are tables of congressional delegations from Nebraska to the United States House of Representatives and the United States Senate.

The current dean of the Nebraska delegation is Representative Adrian Smith (NE-3), having served in the House since 2007.

U.S. House of Representatives

Current members 
List of members, their terms in office, district boundaries, and the district political ratings according to the CPVI. The delegation has 3 members, all Republicans.

Delegate from Nebraska Territory

1867–1883: One seat

1883–1893: Three seats

1893–1933: Six seats

1933–1943: Five seats

1943–1963: Four seats

1963–present: Three seats

U.S. Senate

Key

See also

List of United States congressional districts
Nebraska's congressional districts
Political party strength in Nebraska

References 

 
 
Nebraska
Politics of Nebraska
Congressional delegations